Justice House may refer to:

Byron O. House (1902–1969), chief justice of the Illinois Supreme Court
Charles S. House (1908–1996), associate justice of the Connecticut Supreme Court

See also
 Universal House of Justice, the supreme governing institution of the Bahá'í Faith
 Roberts-Justice House, historic home located at Kernersville, Forsyth County, North Carolina